Ashot the Beautiful was a Georgian Bagratid prince of Tao-Klarjeti. Son of Adarnase II of Tao-Klarjeti. Died in 867.

References 

Bagrationi dynasty of Tao-Klarjeti
9th-century rulers in Asia